Khedri and Khederi may refer to:
 Khedri, Hamadan
 Khedri, Sistan and Baluchestan